Stamnes Church is a parish church of the Church of Norway in Vaksdal Municipality in Vestland county, Norway. It is located in the village of Stamneshella. It is the church for the Stamnes parish which is part of the Hardanger og Voss prosti (deanery) in the Diocese of Bjørgvin. The white, wooden church was built in a long church design in 1861 using plans drawn up by the architects Peter Høier Holtermann and Jacob Wilhelm Nordan. The church seats about 250 people.

History
The earliest existing historical records of the church date back to the year 1328, but the church was not new that year. The first church in Stamnes was a wooden stave church that was likely built during the 13th century. Very little is known about this church. The church is said to have received a new pulpit in 1582 and chairs around 1590. During the first part of the 1600s, the old stave church was torn down and replaced with a timber-framed long church. In 1687–1689, a new choir had been built for the church, and a total of six new windows had been installed in the choir and nave.

In 1814, this church served as an election church. Together with more than 300 other parish churches across Norway, it was a polling station for elections to the 1814 Norwegian Constituent Assembly which wrote the Constitution of Norway. This was Norway's first national elections. Each church parish was a constituency that elected people called "electors" who later met together in each county to elect the representatives for the assembly that was to meet in Eidsvoll later that year.

By the mid-1800s, the church was too small for the population, and it needed to be enlarged or replaced. In 1861, the old church was torn down and replaced with a present church building. The new building was designed by Peter Høier Holtermann and the architect for the Ministry of Church Affairs, Jacob Wilhelm Nordan, modified the tower before the plans were approved. Nils Mjøs was the construction manager for the project. The new building was consecrated on 20 October 1861. In the 1950s, the church received electric lighting and heating. In 1961, an addition was built just east of the choir containing a sacristy, bathroom, and meeting room.

See also
List of churches in Bjørgvin

References

Vaksdal
Churches in Vestland
Long churches in Norway
Wooden churches in Norway
19th-century Church of Norway church buildings
Churches completed in 1861
13th-century establishments in Norway
Norwegian election church